Mount Hood Parkdale is the official United States Postal Service-designated name of the combined post offices of the communities of Mount Hood and Parkdale in the U.S. state of Oregon. Its ZIP code is 97041.

References

 

Unincorporated communities in Hood River County, Oregon
Unincorporated communities in Oregon